Hell's Four Hundred is a 1926 American silent drama film directed by John Griffith Wray and starring Margaret Livingston, Harrison Ford, and Henry Kolker. A dream sequence towards the end of the film was shot in Technicolor.

Cast

References

Bibliography
 Solomon, Aubrey. The Fox Film Corporation, 1915-1935: A History and Filmography. McFarland, 2011.

External links

Hell’s 400 at silentera.com

1926 films
1926 drama films
Silent American drama films
American silent feature films
1920s English-language films
Fox Film films
Films directed by John Griffith Wray
American black-and-white films
Silent films in color
1920s American films